Jadval-e Ghureh may refer to:
 Jadval-e Ghureh-ye Mehrian
 Jadval-e Ghureh-ye Mokhtar
 Jadval-e Ghureh-ye Nareh Gah